The 2012 Kurume Best Amenity International Women's Tennis was a professional tennis tournament played on grass courts. It was the tenth edition of the tournament which was part of the 2012 ITF Women's Circuit. It took place in Kurume, Fukuoka, Japan between 14 and 20 May 2012.

WTA entrants

Seeds

 1 Rankings are as of May 7, 2012.

Other entrants
The following players received wildcards into the singles main draw:
  Yumi Miyazaki
  Yumi Nakano
  Riko Sawayanagi
  Akiko Yonemura

The following players received entry from the qualifying draw:
  Kazusa Ito
  Justyna Jegiołka
  Kim So-jung
  Makoto Ninomiya

Champions

Singles

 Zheng Saisai def.  Monique Adamczak, 7–5, 6–2

Doubles

 Han Xinyun /  Sun Shengnan def.  Ksenia Lykina /  Melanie South, 6–1, 6–0

External links
ITF Search
Official Website

Kurume Best Amenity International Women's Tennis
Kurume Best Amenity Cup
2012 in Japanese tennis